Janice "Jan" Pauls (née Long; September 26, 1952 – July 5, 2017) was a Republican member of the Kansas House of Representatives who represented the 102nd district from 1991 to 2016. She was also a member of the Kansas Sentencing Commission.

Policies 
Pauls was known for her social conservatism and played a role in Kansas Amendment 1 against same-sex marriage. The amendment was later ruled to be unconstitutional following Obergefell v. Hodges in 2015. She was also one of the few Democratic politicians endorsed by "Kansans for Life PAC" in 2012.

Party change 
Formerly a Democrat, Pauls changed her party affiliation to Republican in May 2014.

Committee membership
 Corrections and Juvenile Justice
 Judiciary (Ranking Member)
 Rules and Journal
 Joint Committee on Administrative Rules and Regulations
 Joint Committee on Corrections and Juvenile Justice Oversight

References

External links
 Project Vote Smart profile

Members of the Kansas House of Representatives
Politicians from Hutchinson, Kansas
2017 deaths
Women state legislators in Kansas
Kansas Democrats
1952 births
Kansas Republicans
21st-century American politicians
21st-century American women politicians
Kansas lawyers
20th-century American lawyers
Conservatism in the United States
20th-century American women politicians
20th-century American politicians